Samuel Nuckles was a legislator in South Carolina during the Reconstruction era. He represented Union County. A Republican, he gave testimony about a campaign of intimidation used by Democrats and the Ku Klux Klan in the 1870 election. In 1871 he was part of a delegation sent to Washington D.C. requesting federal troops to address "outrages". He testified that he was a former slave and could read a little and write his name. He also testified that he was a refugee from Union County due to threats of violence and Ku Klux Klan attacks.

Nuckles was a state representative for Union County from 1868 until 1872. He is buried at Mulberry Chapel Methodist Church.
His photograph was included in a montage of Radical Republican South Carolina legislators.

References

African-American state legislators in South Carolina
19th-century American politicians
People from Union County, South Carolina

Year of birth missing

Year of death missing